Vossestrand is a former municipality in the old Hordaland county in Norway.  The  municipality existed from 1868 until its dissolution in 1964. It was located in the northern part of the present-day municipality of Voss.  The municipality was centered on the nearby villages of Vinje and Oppheim, where the two churches for the municipality are located: Vinje Church and Oppheim Church.  The large lake Oppheimsvatnet sat in the central part of the municipality. The administrative centre was at Vasstrondi, on the south side of the lake Oppheimsvatnet.

History

The municipality of Vossestrand was created on 1 January 1868 when the old (large) municipality of Voss was divided. The northern part became Vossestrand and the southern part remained as Voss. Initially, Vossestrand had a population of 2,009. On 21 August 1869, an unpopulated area of Voss was administratively transferred to the municipality of Vossestrand. During the 1960s, there were many municipal mergers across Norway due to the work of the Schei Committee. On 1 January 1964, the entire municipality was merged with the neighboring municipalities of Evanger and Voss, forming the present-day Voss Municipality.  There were 1,573 residents at the time of the merger.

Municipal council
The municipal council  of Vossestrand was made up of 17 representatives that were elected to four year terms.  The party breakdown of the final municipal council was as follows:

See also
List of former municipalities of Norway

References

Voss
Former municipalities of Norway
1868 establishments in Norway
1964 disestablishments in Norway